Norhydrocodone is the major metabolite of the opioid analgesic hydrocodone. It is formed from hydrocodone in the liver via N-demethylation predominantly by CYP3A4. Unlike hydromorphone, a minor metabolite of hydrocodone, norhydrocodone is described as inactive. However, norhydrocodone is actually an agonist of the μ-opioid receptor with similar potency to hydrocodone, but has been found to produce only minimal analgesia when administered peripherally to animals. This is likely due to poor blood-brain-barrier and thus central nervous system penetration.

See also 
 Norbuprenorphine
 Norbuprenorphine-3-glucuronide
 Normorphine
 Noroxymorphone

References 

4,5-Epoxymorphinans
Ketones
Opioid metabolites